The Columbus Line Subdivision is a railroad line owned by CSX Transportation in the U.S. state of Ohio. The line runs from Galion south to Columbus along a former New York Central Railroad line. 

At its north end, the Columbus Line Subdivision meets the Greenwich Subdivision (northeast towards Cleveland) and the Mount Victory Subdivision (west towards Indianapolis). At its south end, it connects with the Columbus Subdivision (north towards Toledo and south towards Kentucky) and the Western Branch (northwest towards Toledo).

Trains that run on the Columbus Line Subdivision as of July 2019 are Q634 Columbus to Selkirk, Q635 Selkirk to Columbus, Y222 Columbus to Worthington, and D756 Crestline to Columbus (Turn). A few grain trains run on this line as well.

History
The line was opened by the Cleveland, Columbus and Cincinnati Railroad in 1851. In 1853, the Bellefontaine and Indiana Railroad opened from Galion west into Indiana, making Galion the junction that it still is. The line passed through mergers and takeovers into Conrail, and was assigned to CSX in Conrail's 1999 breakup.

References

CSX Transportation lines
Rail infrastructure in Ohio
Cleveland, Cincinnati, Chicago and St. Louis Railway lines